Mexico is a federal republic in the southern half of North America. Mexico has the fifteenth largest nominal GDP and the eleventh largest by purchasing power parity. The Mexican economy is strongly linked to those of its North American Free Trade Agreement (NAFTA) partners, especially the United States. Mexico was the first Latin American member of the Organisation for Economic Co-operation and Development (OECD), joining in 1994. It is classified as an upper-middle income country by the World Bank and a newly industrialized country by several analysts. By 2050, Mexico could become the world's fifth or seventh largest economy. The country is considered both a regional power and middle power, and is often identified as an emerging global power. Mexico is a member of the United Nations, the World Trade Organization, the G8+5, the G20, the Uniting for Consensus and the Pacific Alliance.

For further information on the types of business entities in this country and their abbreviations, see "Business entities in México".

Largest firms 

This list shows firms in the Fortune Global 500, which ranks firms by total revenues reported before March 31, 2017. Only the top five firms (if available) are included as a sample.

Notable firms 
This list includes notable companies with primary headquarters located in the country. The industry and sector follow the Industry Classification Benchmark taxonomy. Organizations which have ceased operations are included and noted as defunct.

See also 

 Economy of Mexico
 List of hotels in Mexico
 List of Mexican brands
 Mexican Stock Exchange
 Small and medium enterprises in Mexico

References 

 01
.
Mexico
L